James Glendinning (June 2, 1849 – November 26, 1929) was an Ontario farmer and political figure. He represented Ontario North in the Legislative Assembly of Ontario as a Conservative member from 1890 to 1894.

He was born in Brock Township, Canada West in 1849 and grew up there. In 1871, he married Elizabeth Doble. Glendinning served on the township council for Brock and was reeve from 1885 to 1890. He lived near Vroomanton. He died in 1929.

References

External links 
The Canadian parliamentary companion, 1891 JA Gemmill

1849 births
1929 deaths
Progressive Conservative Party of Ontario MPPs